David Farkas (born November 28, 1975) is an American actor and musician.

Biography
Farkas was born in Akron, Ohio, but Orange County, California has been his home since 1988. At Sunny Hills High School he was a member of an all-league water polo team. He was also a member of the North Orange County All-Star Team. He then played water polo at Claremont McKenna College where he was an All-SCIAC, All-American selection his senior year. He was also a two-time captain and a member of the CMS Athletic Wall of Fame.

Theatre/TV/Film
After college, David started pursuing theatre. He worked at several theatre companies throughout Los Angeles and Orange County, performing as Joseph in Joseph and the Amazing Technicolor Dreamcoat, Jim in The Rainmaker, Johnny Case in Holiday, Joe in Heaven Can Wait, and Nick in Baby.

 He also played the title role, Conrad Birdie in Bye Bye Birdie at the Grove Theatre, and Buck Holden in Nite Club Confidential at the Sierra Repertory Theatre.<ref>{{cite news|title=Confidential' noir is a bit pale|work=The Union Democrat|first=Diane|last=Nelson|date=July 20, 2006}}</ref> Diane Nelson writes in her review of 'Nite Club' in The Union Democrat, "Equity actor David Farkas is a spiffy Buck Holden, with his Phillip Marlowe delivery and winning smile. He narrates the whole review, and still finds the energy to dance and sing like a pro." Playing the title role of Robbie in a musical version of The Wedding Singer, David played guitar on stage for the first time, and created a 'likable, wholly credible character...' without copying Sandler's screen portrayal.

During this time, David also started pursuing more television and film roles. His first part was in the daytime soap, The Bold and the Beautiful. He would go on later to have a recurring principal role on Passions, and a principal role on The Young and the Restless. His film debut as David A. Farkas came when he was cast in Flightplan (2005), starring Jody Foster. He then played Chad in the suspense film Dark Mirror (2007), starring Lisa Vidal. He also had roles on Ghost Whisperer, Perception, NCIS: Los Angeles, All My Children, General Hospital, Wicked Wicked Games, and Criminal Minds.Criminal Minds Season 10 Spoilers, Christianity Daily Currently in production, David plays Sgt. Eddie Bracket in Fatal Crossroads, a film which depicts the Malmedy massacre during WWII. In the Coaching Corner segment 'Filming Fatal Crossroads,' Director R.J. Adams documents some behind the scenes footage of the making of the film.

Music
David and his wife Brittany Farkas released their debut album, Smilin', on December 5, 2016.  Meredith Schneider from Impose Magazine called their debut album an 'Emotionally turbulent and fun work of art,' and New Jersey Stage Magazine writers Rich and Laura Lynch said David and Brittany 'aim to uplift and their first effort will leave you smiling, that's for sure.'
Their second album, Our America, was released in 2018 and features the single 'First Lullaby.'  Our America'' also 'features the single, 'Grace', a christian based song that the couple wrote about trust and faith.'

References

External links

1975 births
20th-century American male actors
21st-century American male actors
American male film actors
American male television actors
Autism activists
Living people
Male actors from Akron, Ohio